Vermillion is the surname of:

 Charles W. Vermillion, a justice of the Iowa Supreme Court from 1923 to 1927
 Iris Vermillion (born 1960), German operatic mezzo-soprano
 Texas Jack Vermillion (1842–1911), American Old West gunfighter
 Joseph Vermillion, African American lynched in 1889